Hilary Duff: The Concert – The Girl Can Rock, commonly referred to as The Girl Can Rock, is the first live video album by American recording artist Hilary Duff, released on August 10, 2004, by Hollywood Records. It contains a full concert from Ventura Theatre, Ventura, California and an accompanying music video for her single "Come Clean". Some special features of the DVD include Duff's appearance on Ryan Seacrest's On Air television program and her getting her first surfing lesson. In addition, the DVD contains footage of Duff recording "Crash World" and an interview with Duff discussing her self-titled album. Duff's DVD won the DVDX Award for Best Overall DVD in the Music Program. The DVD was nominated for the home video VSDA Award. The album was also certified four times platinum in Canada by Canadian Recording Industry Association (CRIA).

Track listing

Certifications

Release history

Awards and nominations

References

External links
 
The Girl Can Rock at Amazon.com
The Girl Can Rock at Disney DVD

Hilary Duff video albums
2004 video albums
Hollywood Records video albums
Live video albums